Karen Blixen Museum may refer to:

 Karen Blixen Museum (Denmark), a museum in Rungsted north of Copenhagen
 Karen Blixen Museum (Kenya), a museum outside Nairobi